Margaret the Barefooted (1325–1395) was born into a poor family in San Severino, Italy. She was abused by her husband for years because of her dedication to the church and to helping the poor and sick. She walked barefooted as a beggar to better associate herself with the poor. She died widowed in 1395 of natural causes.

References

1325 births
1395 deaths
People from the Province of Macerata
14th-century Italian people
14th-century Christian saints
Female saints of medieval Italy
14th-century Italian women